Lanette Prediger (born August 23, 1979) is a Canadian skeleton racer who has competed since 2007. In 2014-15, Lanette had 4 top-10 finishes including a fourth place at St. Moritz. She competed for the top of the World Cup overall ranking.

References

External links
 
 

1979 births
Canadian female skeleton racers
Living people